Helvella macropus is a species of fungus in the family Helvellaceae of the order Pezizales. Ascocarps are found in summer and autumn in woodland, usually (though not exclusively) associated with broad-leaved trees. The slender stem, up to 5 centimeters high, supports a cup shaped cap, the whole fruiting body being pale grey or brown, the inner (hymenial) surface of the cup usually being darker. It is inedible.

Distribution
This species has a wide distribution in the northern hemisphere, having been recorded in Europe, North and Central America and also in China, and Japan.

References

External links
Index Fungorum
GBIF

macropus
Fungi of Asia
Fungi of Europe
Fungi described in 1796
Inedible fungi